The Longest Night is a 1991 Spanish historical drama film directed by José Luis García Sánchez which stars Juan Echanove alongside Carmen Conesa and Juan Diego. Written by García Sánchez alongside Carmen Rico Godoy and Manuel Gutiérrez Aragón, the screenplay is based on the story El año que murió Franco by Pedro J. Ramírez.

Plot 
The plot concerns about the last executions carried out by the Francoist dictatorship on 27 September 1975.

Cast 
  as Gloria
 Juan Echanove as Juan
 Juan Diego as Menéndez
 Gabino Diego as Fito
 Fernando Guillén Cuervo

Production 
Based on the book by Pedro J. Ramírez, the screenplay was penned by Carmen Rico Godoy, Manuel Gutiérrez Aragón, and José Luis García Sánchez. The film was produced by Andrés Vicente Gómezs Iberoamericana Films. Shooting locations included  in Madrid.

Release 
The film screened in competition at the 39th San Sebastián International Film Festival on 23 September 1991. Distributed by United International Pictures, the film was released theatrically in Spain on 4 October 1991.

Reception 
The film was met by chilliness by the critics, most acrimoniously by the Basque ones. Casimiro Torreiro of El País questioned the choices of silencing that two ETA members were facing the same plight as those detainees in the fiction, with the film also concealing the names of the organizations to which the depicted anti-fascists belonged to (the FRAP).

See also 
 List of Spanish films of 1991

References 

Films set in 1975
1990s Spanish films
1990s Spanish-language films
Spanish historical drama films
Films directed by José Luis García Sánchez
Films set in Spain
Films shot in Madrid